Kevin Fickenscher, M.D., CPE, FACPE, FAAFP currently serves as the president/CEO of CREO Strategic Solutions, LLC – a consulting, advisory and management services company involved in all aspects of the telecare field – from care delivery to both undergraduate and continuing education related to virtual care delivery. He is also extensively involved in leadership development for organizations of all sizes. CREO is an organization which provides a network of senior-level people resources with extensive backgrounds in all aspects of healthcare. He has also previously served as the director for healthcare at The MITRE Corporation, a federally funded research and development corporation providing services to the federal government; interim CMO for AMC Health, a remote care management programs; and CEO of the American Medical Informatics Association (AMIA), the leading association of informaticians throughout the world. Prior to serving as CEO and president of AMIA, he was chief strategy and development officer for healthcare at Dell. He also developed and led the Information Systems Consulting Group and the International Healthcare as an executive vice president at Perot Systems prior to Dell purchasing the company in 2009. Fickenscher also served as the national director and partner for clinical transformation within the Global Health Solutions Group at Computer Sciences Corporation. Prior to these key roles, he served as the chief medical officer for a number of healthcare organizations, including: WebMD, Catholic Healthcare West – now part of CommonSpirit, a regional healthcare system based in San Francisco, California; and, Aurora Health Care, an integrated health system in eastern Wisconsin.

Early in his career, Fickenscher pursued an academic career and served as the founder of The Center for Rural Health at the University of North Dakota, a nationally recognized program dedicated to rural health service, research, and policy analysis, and as the assistant dean and president/CEO of the Michigan State University/ Kalamazoo Center for Medical Studies, one of six campuses for the MSU College of Human Medicine.

Fickenscher is a regular participant in discussions and debates related to the future of healthcare, including testimony before Congress and participation in a variety of international healthcare forums.  Among his other accomplishments, Fickenscher was awarded a Kellogg National Fellowship in 1985 by the W. K. Kellogg Foundation and served as the Health Advisor to Joe Biden's 1988 presidential campaign. The Healthcare Forum and Korn/Ferry International recognized him nationally as one of six Emerging Leaders in Healthcare for 1991. He was also a regional finalist for The White House Fellows Program; Recipient, North Dakota Leadership Award of Excellence; and, served on the Clinton healthcare task force reform efforts.

In May 2007, Modern Healthcare ranked Fickenscher as No. 12 among The 50 Most Powerful Physician Executives in Healthcare, 2007.

Fickenscher graduated from the University of North Dakota School of Medicine and Health Sciences in 1978 and completed his residency in family medicine in 1982.  He has multiple publications and has presented extensively throughout the world on issues related to the future of health care, information technology strategy, virtual care delivery and on leadership topics such as persistence and resilience.

References

Year of birth missing (living people)
American health care chief executives
University of North Dakota alumni
Living people
Dell people